Burg Heinfels is a castle in Heinfels, Tyrol, Austria.

History 
Heinfels stands in the Puster Valley, near the entrance to the Villgraten Valley. Although the town was first settled by Huns around 500AD, a castle was not mentioned until 1243. It belonged to the County of Gorz, and was expanded on the west side in 1500. From the end of the 15th century until 1508 it was a Gorizia and Habsburgian fief of Virgil von Graben and his son Lukas von Graben zum Stein. Afterwards it belonged to cardinal Melchior von Meckau. In 1526, it was besieged by Michael Gaismair and 2,000 soldiers seeking to overthrow Catholic rule in the area. Today it is privately owned.

References
This article was initially translated from the German Wikipedia.

External links
Gemeinde Heinfels. "Burg Heinfels"

See also
List of castles in Austria

Castles in Tyrol (state)